Emil Alfons Holm (born 13 May 2000) is a Swedish professional footballer who plays as a right-back for Serie A club Spezia and the Sweden national team.

Club career
At the end of January 2021, Holm joined Danish Superliga club SønderjyskE. Holm was sold to Italian club Spezia Calcio on 27 August, owned by the same owner of SønderjyskE, and loaned out to SønderjyskE for the rest of the season.

International career 
Holm represented the Sweden U19 and U21 times a total of 16 times between 2018 and 2022. He made his full international debut for Sweden on 16 November 2022 in a friendly game against Mexico, playing the full 90 minutes in a 2–1 win.

Career statistics

Club

International

Honours
IFK Göteborg
 Svenska Cupen: 2019–20

References

External links 
 Emil Holm at SvFF (in Swedish)

2000 births
Living people
Swedish footballers
Swedish expatriate footballers
Sweden youth international footballers
IFK Göteborg players
SønderjyskE Fodbold players
Spezia Calcio players
Allsvenskan players
Danish Superliga players
Association football defenders
Swedish expatriate sportspeople in Denmark
Swedish expatriate sportspeople in Italy
Expatriate men's footballers in Denmark
Expatriate footballers in Italy
Footballers from Gothenburg